Kandasamy (alternate spellings include Kantacami, Kandasami, Kanthasamy, Kanthaswamy and others) is a Tamil name for Kartikeya. It is also a common given name.

People 
M. Kandaswamy Padayachi, former Ulundurpet MLA
K. Kandasamy, former Andipatti MLA
R. Kandaswami, former Tiruchengode MLA
K. V. Kandaswamy, former Kinathukadavu MLA
M. Kandaswamy, former Kulithalai MLA
P. Kandaswamy, former Pongalur MLA
K. P. Kandasamy, former Tamil Nadu minister and founder of Dinakaran

Cinema 
Kanthaswamy, a 2009 Indian Tamil film directed by Susi Ganesan

fr:Kandasaamy